Mount Prindle is a granitic mountain in the Yukon–Tanana Uplands, and is located approximately  north-northeast of Fairbanks, Alaska. The plutons that form the core of the Mount Prindle massif are Late Cretaceous or early Tertiary age. These plutons intruded older (Precambrian to Paleozoic) metamorphic rocks. Mount Prindle exhibits classic glacial landforms, unlike most of the surrounding Yukon–Tanana Uplands. It is in the Circle Mining District and many of the surrounding creeks have been or are being mined for placer gold. The area has also been prospected for tin and rare earth minerals. Mine roads and hiking trails provide access to the mountain. A  granite wall on an eastern spur of the massif is an attraction for rock climbers.

The mountain is named for Louis Marcus Prindle (1865–1956), a U.S. Geological Survey geologist, who worked in the Fairbanks, Circle, and Fortymile areas of Alaska from 1902 through 1911.


See also

List of mountain peaks of North America
List of mountain peaks of the United States
List of mountain peaks of Alaska

References

External links
 Weather forecast: Mount Prindle

Prindle
Landforms of Yukon–Koyukuk Census Area, Alaska
Mountains of Unorganized Borough, Alaska